O Doutrinador: A Série is a Brazilian action-thriller television series based on the homonymous comic series created by Luciano Cunha. The series was released on September 1, 2019 on Space and complements the events of the film of the same name released in November 2018.

Cast and characters 
 Kiko Pissolato as Miguel Montessant (O Doutrinador)
 Tainá Medina as Nina
 Samuel de Assis as Edu
 Carlos Betão as Antero Gomes
 Nicolas Trevijano as Diogo
 Eucir de Souza as Deputado Djalma Dias
 Marília Gabriela as Ministra Marta Regina
 Eduardo Moscovis as Sandro Corrêa
 Gustavo Vaz as Antero Gomes Filho (Anterinho)
 Natália Lage as Isabela Montessant 
 Tuca Andrada as Tenente Siqueira
 Natallia Rodrigues as Penélope
 Helena Ranaldi as Julia Machado
 Lucy Ramos as Marina Sales
 Ricardo Dantas as Dantão
 Helena Luz as Alice Montessant

References

External links 
 

2010s Brazilian television series
2019 Brazilian television series debuts
Brazilian action television series
Brazilian crime television series
Brazilian drama television series
Brazilian thriller television series
Portuguese-language television shows
Television series based on Brazilian comics
Television shows filmed in São Paulo (state)
Television shows set in Brazil